The 1999 World Figure Skating Championships were held in Helsinki, Finland from March 20 through 28. Medals were awarded in the disciplines of men's singles, ladies' singles, pair skating, and ice dancing.

1999 was the first year that the qualifying competition in the men's and ladies' events counted towards the total score. Qualifying was 20% of the total score, the short program 30%, and the free skating 50%.

Medal tables

Medalists

Medals by country

Competition notes
Due to the large number of participants, the men's and ladies' qualifying groups were split into groups A and B. In the ladies' qualifying group B, Klara Bramfeldt (SWE) and Marion Krijgsman (NED) tied for 17th place, leading to a three-way tie in overall standings for 33rd place in the ladies' event.

Results

Men

Referee:
 Sally-Anne Stapleford 

Assistant Referee:
 Hideo Sugita 

Judges:
 Lone Villefrance 
 Jan Olesinski 
 Merja Kosonen 
 Ute Boehm 
 Peter Rankin 
 Igor Prokop 
 Jörg Badraun 
 Zsofia Wagner 
 Zoya Yordanova 

Substitute judge:
 Vladislav Petukhov

Ladies

Referee:
 Britta Lindgren 

Assistant Referee:
 Hugh Graham 

Judges:
 Franco Benini 
 Marina Sanaya 
 Bettina Meier 
 Jiasheng Yang 
 Agnes Morvai 
 Maria Hrachovcova 
 Christa Gunsam 
 Pekka Leskinen 
 Kenji Amako 

Substitute judge:
 Marianne Oeverby

Pairs

Referee:
 Hely Abbondati 

Assistant Referee:
 Alexander Lakernik 

Judges:
 Jane Garden 
 Volker Waldeck 
 Franklin Nelson 
 Anne Hardy-Thomas 
 Liliana Strechova 
 Evgenia Bogdanova 
 Alfred Korytek 
 Sviatoslav Babenko 
 Maria Zuchowicz 

Substitute judge:
 Alexei Shirshov

Ice dancing

Referee:
 Alexander Gorshkov 

Assistant Referee:
 Marie Lundmark 

Judges:
 Elizabeth Clark 
 Walter Zuccaro 
 Yury Balkov 
 Mary Parry 
 Alla Shekhovtseva 
 Ulf Denzer 
 Evgenia Karnolska 
 Hongguo Ren 
 Margaret Faulkner 

Substitute judge:
 Heide Maritczak

References

External links
 1999 World Figure Skating Championships at the Internet Archive

World Figure Skating Championships
World Figure Skating Championships
World Figure Skating Championships
World Figure Skating Championships 1999
International figure skating competitions hosted by Finland
International sports competitions in Helsinki
2000s in Helsinki
March 1999 sports events in Europe